LMN (also known previously as Lifetime Movies, and an initialism for Lifetime Movie Network) is an American pay television network owned by A&E Networks, a joint venture between the Disney Media Networks subsidiary of The Walt Disney Company and the Hearst Communications. LMN carries movies and exclusive shows aimed at women, especially made for television movies. Many, though not all, of the movies that air on the network are Lifetime originals that were first shown on the flagship Lifetime channel; in turn, the network also premieres original films that are later broadcast on Lifetime. Until they ended their involvement in television films in the early 2000s, the network's earliest programming consisted of movies originally meant for broadcast networks.

As of February 2015, LMN is available to approximately 82,031,000 pay television households (70.5% of households with television) in the United States.

An Australian version of the channel launched on September 1, 2020 through Foxtel.

History
The network launched on June 29, 1998, as Lifetime Movie Network, a digital cable and direct broadcast satellite extension of its main network. Variety praised the move as "capitalizing on the expected channel boom from TV’s conversion to digital distribution over the next few years." However, it only reached 3 million of the 70 million pay-television subscribers in the U.S. at the time.

The original format of the network consisted of longer blocks of made-for-television movies with limited commercial interruptions, airing twice a day. As the network grew and broadcast networks ceased producing made-for-TV movies, more commercial breaks were added during its film content. The network also added theatrical film releases to its schedule. The network airs different movies each day, although the movies aired at 8:00 p.m. and 10:00 p.m. ET each day are re-aired at 12:00 a.m. and 2:00 a.m. (9:00 p.m. and 11:00 p.m. PT).

On April 19, 2009, the broadcast of Natalee Holloway attracted 3.2 million viewers for the network, more than 1 million of which were among the demographic of women aged 18–49, garnering the highest ratings in the network's history at that time. On August 27, 2009, A+E Networks acquired Lifetime Entertainment Services, which was jointly owned by the former's corporate parents The Walt Disney Company and the Hearst Corporation in conjunction with NBCUniversal (which sold its interest to the two other companies in 2011).

On October 13, 2013, the network debuted its first original series, the reality-based murder mystery program Killer Profile. In addition, three series that had previously aired on sister network The Biography Channel – The Haunting Of, I Survived... and Celebrity Ghost Stories – also moved to LMN that year. In March 2014, A+E Networks moved the drama series Those Who Kill to LMN, becoming the first scripted series to air on the network, although it solely moved to LMN to burn off the remaining episodes of the low-rated A&E program.

Rebrandings
Over its -year history, the network has vacillated its main branding several times, usually alternating between its full name of Lifetime Movie Network and their initials of LMN depending on the network's marketing plan at the time of the name change. The network's branding history is as follows:

Lifetime Movie Network (June 29, 1998 – July 2006; June 2008 - 2011, November 1, 2019 - present as a full name)
LMN (July 2006 – June 2008; 2011 – July 10, 2017; November 1, 2019 – present for LMN)
Lifetime Movies (July 11, 2017 – October 31, 2019)

See also
 Lifetime
 Lifetime Real Women
 Lifetime (Canada)
 Lifetime (UK and Ireland)

References

External links
 

Lifetime (TV network)
Movie channels in the United States
Television channels and stations established in 1998
Television networks in the United States
English-language television stations in the United States
Women's interest channels
1998 establishments in the United States